The men's heptathlon event  at the 1993 IAAF World Indoor Championships was held on 13 and 14 March. Held for the first time, heptathlon was a non-championship event at this edition and the medals awarded did not count towards the total medal status.

Results

References

Official results

Heptathlon
Combined events at the World Athletics Indoor Championships